USS Lamar may refer to the following ships of the United States Navy:

 , an attack transport commissioned on 6 April 1944 and decommissioned on 7 March 1946
 , a patrol craft commissioned on 17 March 1945 and transferred to the United States Coast Guard on 29 July 1964

United States Navy ship names